John A. Adams Farmstead Historic District, also known as Cedarcroft Farm, is a historic home and farm and national historic district located near Warrensburg, Johnson County, Missouri.   The district consists of four contributing properties—three contributing buildings and one contributing structure. The buildings are a house (c. 1867-1876), a barn (c. 1867), and a barn (c. 1880). The structure is a system of sewer and drainage tiles and dams constructed beginning in 1875 and which underlays much of the district.

It was listed on the National Register of Historic Places in 1994.

References

Historic districts on the National Register of Historic Places in Missouri
Farms on the National Register of Historic Places in Missouri
Buildings and structures in Johnson County, Missouri
National Register of Historic Places in Johnson County, Missouri